Woodlawn is an unincorporated community in Monroe County, in the U.S. state of Missouri.

History
A post office called Woodlawn was established in 1844, and remained in operation until 1907. The community is located in Woodlawn Township, hence the name.

References

Unincorporated communities in Monroe County, Missouri
Unincorporated communities in Missouri